Abūʾl-Ḥusayn Hilāl b. Muḥassin b. Ibrāhīm  al-Ṣābīʾ  (Arabic: ابو الحسين هلال بن محسن بن ابراهيم الصابئ) (born: 358 A.H./c. 969 A.D., died: 447-448 A.H./1056 A.D.) (aged 90 lunar) was a historian, bureaucrat, and writer of Arabic.  Born into a family of Sabian bureaucrats, al-Ṣābi converted to Islam in 402-403 A.H/1012 AD.  First working under the Buyid amir Ṣamṣām al-Dawla, he later became the Director of the Chancery under Baha' al-Daula's vizier Fakhr al-Mulk.

Works

Hilal al-Sabi' is the author of numerous books, not all of which have survived.  Bureaucratic matters and matters of the court were his main themes, along with history.

The Rules and Regulations of the Abbasid Court - (Arabic: رسوم دار الخلافة Rusum dar al-khilafa)

Perhaps his most famous book is the Rusum dar al-khilafa which is a manual for behavior and work in the Abbasid court of late Buyid Baghdad.  Though it is designed as a set of instructions and advice, the book contains numerous statistics, anecdotes and historical asides.

The Book of Viziers - (Arabic: كتاب الوزراء Kitab al-wuzara)

Only of the beginning of this work has survived, which deals with the viziers of the caliph Al-Muqtadir.

History of Hilal al-Sabi'  - (Arabic: تاريخ ابي الحسين هلال بن المحسن بن ابراهيم الصابي Tarikh Hilal al-Sabi)

This too survives only in fragmentary form, but its fragments fill a gap in the chronicles of the late Buyid era, up to the year 393 hijri (1003 AD).

See also
:Category:Sabian scholars from the Abbasid Caliphate
Al-Battani
Thābit ibn Qurra

References

Bibliography
 
 Hilāl al-Sābi’.  Rusūm Dār al-Khilāfa: The Rules and Regulations of the Abbasid Court.  Trans. Elie A. Salem.  American University of Beirut, 1977.

See also
 List of Muslim historians
 Islamic scholars

960s births
1056 deaths
Converts to Islam
11th-century historians from the Abbasid Caliphate
Historians under the Buyid dynasty
Buyid officials
Sabian scholars from the Abbasid Caliphate